Renmin Road Subdistrict  is a subdistrict situated in Dawukou District, Shizuishan, Ningxia, China. , it administers the following seven residential neighborhoods:
Jianshe Community
Gongren Street Community
Wenming Community
Hongxing Community
Youyidong Street Community
Dongfang Community
Minsheng Community

See also
List of township-level divisions of Ningxia

References

Township-level divisions of Ningxia
Shizuishan
Subdistricts of the People's Republic of China